Tagalis is a genus of assassin bugs in the family Reduviidae.

Species
 Tagalis evavilmae Gil-Santana, Gouveia & Zeraik, 2010
 Tagalis seminigra Champion, 1899

References

Reduviidae
Hemiptera of South America